Ashleigh Barty and Casey Dellacqua were the defending champions, having won the event in 2012, but both players decided not to compete in 2013.

Shuko Aoyama and Misaki Doi won the tournament, defeating Eri Hozumi and Makoto Ninomiya in the all-Japanese final, 7–6(7–1), 2–6, [11–9].

Seeds

Draw

References 
 Draw

Dunlop World Challenge - Women's Doubles
2013 Women's Doubles
2013 Dunlop World Challenge